Venetian Left refers to:
Venetian Left, a separatist social-democratic party founded in 2013;
Venetian Left, a communist party active from 2015 to 2017.